Ms. International is part of the Ms. America Pageant Inc. system and is for women 26 years of age and up who are single, divorced, widowed or married. The beauty pageant has been developed to promote and honor women, celebrate their accomplishments and use their "Crown for a Purpose" to support and encourage involvement in volunteer service.

The pageant is associated with the United States government agency Points of Light. The Presidential Volunteer Service Award is given by the President of the United States to national titleholders for her community service during her reign.

History
Susan Jeske, the founder of Ms. International Pageant, first used the title when she crowned Amanda Delgado, Ms. International 2010 as its first inaugural queen.

Deana Molle' was crowned Ms. International 2011–12 on 7 November 2011 at the Veterans of Foreign Wars Auditorium in Riverside, California,.

Stacy Smith from Colorado, was crowned Ms. International 2013 on 23 June 2013 at the Hilton Orange County Hotel in Costa Mesa, California.

Riti Chikkerur from Texas was crowned Ms. International 2014–15 on 9 August 2014 at the Curtis Theater in Brea, California. She is the first Indian-American to win the title and own an oil company.

Deborah Valis-Flynn from South Carolina, was crowned Ms. International 2016 at the Curtis Theater in Brea, California on 29 August 2015.

Nova Kopp from Georgia was crowned Ms. International 2017 at the Curtis Theater in Brea, California on 3 September 2016. She was the first Ms. International to win $12,000.00 in cash and give it all away to charity. She is a domestic violence awareness advocate and is a survivor herself. Her volunteer service has included working with Meals on Wheels through the Ballina Community Centre in Ireland.

Jolyn Farber representing New York was crowned Ms. International 2018 at the Queen Mary in Long Beach, California on 10 March 2018. She was also the People's Choice Internet Voting winner and won $12,218.90.

Ms. America Pageant Corporation 
The Ms. America Pageant is a California corporation that currently owns and runs the Ms. International, Ms. America, Ms. America International, and Miss Pacific U.S. beauty contests. Based in Costa Mesa, California, the corporation is owned by Susan Jeske who is the CEO.

Gallery of winners

Ms. International Pageant titleholders

References

External links
Official website
Official website of Susan Jeske

Beauty pageants in the United States
International beauty pageants
Recurring events established in 2010
2010 establishments in the United States
2010 establishments in California
History of women in the United States